Rugby in Norway may refer to:

Rugby league in Norway
Rugby union in Norway